Zeal may refer to: 

 Zealotry, fanaticism
 Zeal of the convert
 Diligence, the theological virtue opposite to acedia
 Zeal (horse), race horse
 Zeal (surname)
 Zeal (web), an internet directory
 Zeal Monachorum, a village in Devon
 South Zeal, village in Devon
 , a U.S. Navy minesweeper
 Zeal, an Air New Zealand subsidiary
 Kingdom of Zeal, a kingdom in the Chrono Trigger video game

See also
 Zeals, a village in Wiltshire
 RAF Zeals, a World War II RAF base in Zeals
 Zealot (disambiguation)